Lewis and Clark Recreation Area is a State Recreation Area in southeastern South Dakota, near Yankton. The Recreation Area is located on the northern shore of the 31,400-acre Lewis and Clark Lake, a large Missouri River Reservoir, impounded by Gavins Point Dam.

Three campgrounds are located within the recreation area, called the Yankton Section, Midway Section, and Gavins Point Section - with a total of 418 campsites, along the shores of Lewis and Clark Lake. There are 19 camper cabins. Numerous biking, hiking, equestrian, and nature trails travel along Lewis and Clark Lake and the surrounding bluffs. Several beaches and boat launching facilities can be found along the lakeshore. The area also has a disc golf course and an archery range.

In 2014 zebra mussels, an aquatic invasive mussel were discovered in the lake and have infested the reservoir and the Missouri River downstream of Gavins Point Dam. The Lewis and Clark Marina and Resort, located within the recreation area, is privately operated under an agreement with Division of Parks and Recreation. Amenities include a motel, cabins, swimming pool, floating fuel dock, slip and boat rentals, and a full-service restaurant.

See also
Lewis and Clark Lake
Gavins Point Dam
Chief White Crane Recreation Area
Pierson Ranch Recreation Area
Gavins Point National Fish Hatchery
List of South Dakota state parks

References

External links
Lewis and Clark State Recreation Area
Lewis and Clark Marina and Resort
Recreation.gov - Lewis and Clark Lake

Protected areas of Yankton County, South Dakota
State parks of South Dakota
Protected areas established in 1966
1966 establishments in South Dakota
Tourist attractions in Yankton County, South Dakota